The 15 cm Kanone 18 (15 cm K 18) was a German heavy gun used in the Second World War.

Design and history 
In 1933 Rheinmetall began development of a new artillery piece to fulfill a German Army requirement for a replacement of the aged 15 cm Kanone 16, with the first production units received in 1938. There was not much of an improvement over the older gun as it weighed two tons more than the K 16, but only had  more range. The army was happy with the range, but not with the carriage. There was a special transport carriage for just the gun when traveling long distances. Putting it on its turntable took even more time to assemble. The rate of fire was at best two rounds per minute.

Around a hundred were built between 1939 and 1943. It was not popular in service as it was regarded as too much gun for too little shell. This caused its production to be terminated in August 1943. Many were used in coastal installations.

See also 
 152 mm gun M1935 (Br-2) – Soviet World War II equivalent
 155 mm Long Tom – American World War II equivalent

Notes

References 
 Engelmann, Joachim and Scheibert, Horst. Deutsche Artillerie 1934–1945: Eine Dokumentation in Text, Skizzen und Bildern: Ausrüstung, Gliederung, Ausbildung, Führung, Einsatz. Limburg/Lahn, Germany: C. A. Starke, 1974
 Gander, Terry and Chamberlain, Peter. Weapons of the Third Reich: An Encyclopedic Survey of All Small Arms, Artillery and Special Weapons of the German Land Forces 1939–1945. New York: Doubleday, 1979 
 Hogg, Ian V. German Artillery of World War Two. 2nd corrected edition. Mechanicsville, PA: Stackpole Books, 1997

External links 

World War II artillery of Germany
150 mm artillery
Rheinmetall
Weapons and ammunition introduced in 1940